Shoot Hill railway station was a station to the south of Ford, Shropshire, England. The station was opened in 1921 and closed in 1933. Although Official closure was on 29 February 1960, a 2-coach Stephenson Locomotive Society train ran through on 20 March.

References

Further reading

Disused railway stations in Shropshire
Railway stations in Great Britain opened in 1921
Railway stations in Great Britain closed in 1933